This is a list of yearly Ohio Athletic Conference football standings.

Ohio Athletic Conference football standings

NCAA Division III (1998–present)

References

 

Ohio Athletic Conference
Standings
Ohio Athletic Conference football standings